Memory studies is an academic field studying the use of memory as a tool for remembering the past. It emerged as a new and different way for scholars to think about past events at the end of the 20th century. Memory is the past made present and is a contemporary phenomenon, something that, while concerned with the past, happens in the present; and second, that memory is a form of work, working through, labor, or action.

Contemporary vs past memory 
Contemporary memory differs from memory in past societies in that historical memory today is not what it used to be. It used to mark the relation of a community or a nation to its past but the boundary between past and present used to be stronger and more stable than it appears to be today. Untold recent and not so recent pasts impinge upon the present through modern media of reproduction like photography, film, recorded music and the Internet, as well as through the explosion of historical scholarship and an ever more voracious museal culture. The past has become part of the present in ways simply unimaginable in earlier centuries.

Although remembering is about the past, it takes place in the present establishing the meanings and significance of the past for those who may or may not have experienced it. Memory involves much work and is therefore a “verb” or “action” word and not just the description of a practice. Memory as a “symbolic representation of the past embedded in social action” and is also emphasises that memory is a practice of recollection rather than just a set of facts.

Collective and individual memory 
Memory operates on the individual as well as the collective level. "Memory nonetheless captures simultaneously the individual, embodied, and lived side and the collective, social, and constructed side of our relations to the past”. It allows for individuals, groups and societies to be creative as its “anachronistic quality—its bringing together of now and then, here and there—is actually the source of its powerful creativity, its ability to build new worlds out of the materials of older ones”.

Memory aids in the formation of identity. This alignment, however, is not a direct one as “our relationship with the past only partially determine who we are in the present, but never straightforwardly and directly, and never without unexpected or even unwanted consequences that bind us to those whom we consider other”. Our identities are therefore formed based on personal memories but also the interactions with other memories.

Multidirectional memory 
Memory and the formation of identity is not a homogenous process where one memory forms one identity and another memory forms another identity, exclusively. Instead the heterogeneity of memory means various memories operate and interact in an inexhaustible manner over time which then shape how we come to see ourselves and our experiences in the world as well as our understanding of worldwide issues. Memory should not therefore ideally be a zero-sum game with struggles ensuing over scarce resources as proponents of competitive memory would suggest. The individual as well as the collective memory and relations to the past can exist without one being more important than the other.  The “embodied and lived side of our relations to the past” can share space with the “social and constructed side of our relations to the past”. Therefore, in contrast to competitive memory, multidirectional memory is “subject to ongoing negotiation, cross-referencing, and borrowing; as productive and not privative”.

With this kind of multiplicity of memories, cross cutting themes can be focused on and brought to the fore. Shared themes make it possible to place greater attention on the collective issues faced by various groups rather than the issues specific to individual groups. The society is therefore not homogenous with only one memory of the past in focus at any given time.  Instead, “multidirectional memory considers a series of interventions through which social actions bring multiple traumatic pasts into a heterogeneous and changing post – World War II present”.

Multidirectional memory also means that memories are not the property of groups as is suggested by proponents of competitive memory. This therefore makes the relationship between memory and identity a non-linear one. In creating meaning through multiple memories, groups are not forced to forget the memories of others groups whether they are within the same or across different geographical boundaries. “Memories are not owned by groups – nor are groups “owned” by memories. Rather, the borders of memory and identity are jagged…”

“Pursuing memory’s multidirectionality encourages us to think of the public sphere as a malleable discursive space in which groups do not simply articulate established positions but actually come into being through their dialogical interactions with others; both the subjects and spaces of the public are open to continual reconstruction”. This challenges the dichotomy many writers may express about memory operating competitively where one memory must dominate.

Screen memory 
In discussing multidirectional memory, it is important to highlight that screen memory is also a kind of multidirectional memory, even though screen memory operates more on the personal level while multidirectional memory is primarily collective. Screen memory is “covering up a traumatic event-another traumatic event-that cannot be approached directly”.

Screen memory gains its significance from the presence of other memories and not necessarily as a stand-alone memory. With screen memory, there is more than one memory operating at the same time, except one is displaced by another, so we may not realise the presence of multiple memories. This points to its multidirectionality. The memory being used as a replacement is usually one that is easier to confront. This however does not result in the total silencing of the other memory(ies), which would suggest competition between or among memories.

References 

Memory